Delias gilliardi is a butterfly in the family Pieridae. It was described by Leonard J. Sanford and Neville Henry Bennett in 1955. It is found in Chimbu Province of Papua New Guinea.

The wingspan is about 65–70 mm. Adults are similar to Delias carstensziana, but can be distinguished by the pale yellow colouring on the upperside of both wings.

References

External links
Delias at Markku Savela's Lepidoptera and Some Other Life Forms

gilliardi
Butterflies described in 1955